Atka Island is the largest island in the Andreanof Islands of the Aleutian Islands of Alaska.

The city of Atka, Alaska is on the east side of the island.  The 2000 census population of the island was 95 persons, almost all in the city of Atka.

On December 5, 2008, President George W. Bush created the World War II Valor in the Pacific National Monument. A crashed B-24 Liberator on Atka is one of the nine sites included in the monument.
As of July 2021 Atka is having a new modular medical clinic and quarantine shelter with a morgue being erected. This is through grants of the USDA and other parties such as native corp AHTNA & Whitley Manufacturing to serve the tribe.

Education

Atka is served by the Aleutian Region Schools.

The Yakov E. Netsvetov School serves grades K-12.

References

Further reading
 The author describes his three years serving on Atka as a military cryptologist during World War II.

Andreanof Islands
World War II Valor in the Pacific National Monument
Islands of Alaska
Islands of Unorganized Borough, Alaska